Chengzong is a Chinese temple name. It may refer to:

 Qian Hongzuo (928–947), King Zhongxian of Wuyue
 Temür Khan (1265–1307), Emperor Chengzong of Yuan
 Dorgon (1612–1650), prince regent of the Qing dynasty, once posthumously honoured as Emperor Chengzong of Qing

See also 
 Seongjong (disambiguation), the equivalent Korean name

Temple name disambiguation pages